Gloucestershire County Cricket Club in 2004 were playing their cricket in Division One of the County Championship and totesport league. Despite finishing in mid-table positions in the leagues Gloucestershire won the Cheltenham and Gloucester Trophy, beating Worcestershire by eight wickets in the final at Lord's

In the Final Phil Weston scored 110 and James Averis took four wickets for 23 runs for Gloucestershire. However, Vikram Solanki of Worcestershire was made Man of the Match for his 115 which included 14 fours and the century coming off 128 balls.

In the Twenty20 Cup, Gloucestershire came sixth and last in the Midlands/Wales/West group which was not high enough to proceed from the league stage to the quarter finals. Gloucestershire won one match in the group stage, lost three and had one no-result.

Players 
  Shabbir Ahmed
  Shoaib Malik
  Steve Adshead
  Mark Alleyne
  James Averis
  Martyn Ball
  Alastair Bressington
  Ian Fisher
  Alex Gidman
  Tim Hancock
  Mark Hardinges
  Jon Lewis
  James Pearson
  Jack Russell
  Roger Sillence
  Mike Smith
  Craig Spearman
  Phil Weston
  Matt Windows

Tables

Championship

totesport League

Match details

Gloucestershire v Kent (16–19 April)
County Championship Division One (4-day match)

Kent (16pts) beat Gloucestershire (3pts) by 7 wickets

Gloucestershire v Loughborough UCCE (21–23 April)
University Centres of Cricketing Excellence (3-day match)

Match Drawn

Kent v Gloucestershire (25 April)
National League Division One (45-over match)

Kent (4pts) beat Gloucestershire (0pts) by 1 run

Gloucestershire v Glamorgan (2 May)
National League Division One (45-over match)

Glamorgan (4pts) beat Gloucestershire (0pts) by 8 wickets

Netherlands v Gloucestershire (5 May)
Cheltenham & Gloucester Trophy 2nd Round (50-over match)

Gloucestershire won by 72 runs and qualified for the Third Round of the C&G Trophy

Kent v Gloucestershire (7–10 May)
County Championship Division One (4-day match)

Kent (5pts) drew with Gloucestershire (7pts)

Gloucestershire v Northamptonshire (12–15 may)
County Championship Division One (4-day match)

Gloucestershire (12pts) drew with Northamptonshire (6pts)

Gloucestershire v Surrey (16 May)
National League Division One (45-over match)

Gloucestershire (4pts) beat Surrey (0pts) by 42 runs

Worcestershire v Gloucestershire (18–21 May)
County Championship Division One (4-day match)

Worcestershire (22pts) beat Gloucestershire (2pts)by an innings and 86 runs

Gloucestershire v Hampshire (23 May)
National League Division One (45-over match)

Hampshire (4pts) beat Gloucestershire (0pts) by 4 wickets

Gloucestershire v Hampshire (29 May)
Cheltenham & Gloucester Trophy 3rd Round (50-over match)

Gloucestershire beat Hampshire by 3 wickets to qualify for the Fourth Round of the C&G Trophy

Cricket records and statistics
Gloucestershire County Cricket Club seasons
2004 in English cricket